Agnippe kuznetzovi is a moth of the family Gelechiidae. It is found in south-eastern Kazakhstan, Mongolia and China (Hebei, Ningxia).

The wingspan is 8.5–10 mm. The forewings have a black basal patch, with two overlapping black spots. The hindwings are light grey. Adults are on wing from July to early August.

The larvae feed on the leaves of Sophora alopecuroides.

References

Moths described in 1989
Agnippe
Moths of Asia